Amata stictoptera is a moth of the family Erebidae. It was described by Rothschild in 1910. It is found in Ivory Coast.

References

 Natural History Museum Lepidoptera generic names catalog

Endemic fauna of Ivory Coast
stictoptera
Moths described in 1910
Moths of Africa